This is a list of planned commercial Long-Term Evolution (LTE) networks around the world, grouped by their frequency bands.

Some operators utilize multiple bands and are therefore listed multiple times in respective sections.

General information 
 For technical details on LTE and a list of its designated operating frequencies, bands, and roaming possibilities, see LTE frequency bands.
 Bands 33 to 53 are assigned to TD-LTE.

Africa

Americas

Caribbean

Central and South America (APT band plan)

North America, US Territories (FCC band plan)

Asia

Europe

French overseas departments and territories

Middle East

Oceania

See also 
 LTE
 LTE frequency bands
 List of LTE networks
 List of 5G NR networks
 List of UMTS networks
 List of HSPA+ networks
 List of CDMA2000 networks

References

Lists by country
LTE (telecommunication)
Telecommunications lists
Spectrum auctions